Hellinsia batallonica is a moth of the family Pterophoridae. It is found in Venezuela.

Adults are on wing in March.

References

Moths described in 2001
batallonica
Moths of South America
Endemic fauna of Venezuela